In chemistry, the Halex process is used to convert aromatic chlorides to the corresponding aromatic fluorides.  The process entails Halide exchange, hence the name. The reaction conditions call for hot (150-250 °C) solution of the aryl chloride in dimethylsulfoxide and anhydrous potassium fluoride.  Potassium chloride is generated in the process. The reaction is mainly applied to nitro-substituted aryl chlorides.

The following reactions are practiced commercially in this manner:
1-chloro-2-nitrobenzene  →  1-fluoro-2-nitrobenzene
1-chloro-4-nitrobenzene  →  1-fluoro-4-nitrobenzene
1,2-dichloro-4-nitrobenzene  →  1-chloro-2-fluoro-5-nitrobenzene
1,4-dichloro-2-nitrobenzene  →  1-chloro-4-fluoro-3-nitrobenzene
1-chloro-2,4-dinitrobenzene  →  1-fluoro-2,4-dinitrobenzene
5-chloro-2-nitrobenzotrifluoride  →  5-fluoro-2-nitrobenzotrifluoride
1,3-dichloro-4-nitrobenzene  →  1,3-difluoro-4-nitrobenzene
2,6-dichlorobenzonitrile  →  2,6-difluorobenzonitrile

References

Fluoroarenes
Phenyl compounds